Vida Blue may refer to:
Vida Blue (born 1949), an American Major League Baseball starting pitcher 1969–1983
Vida Blue (band), an American band led by former Phish keyboardist Page McConnell, active 2001–2004, named after Vida Blue
Vida Blue (album), the band Vida Blue's self-titled debut album